Miss Spain 2020 may refer to these events:
Miss Universe Spain 2020, Miss Spain 2020 for Miss Universe 2020
Miss World Spain 2020, Miss Spain 2020 for Miss World 2021/2020

Disambiguation pages